The United States Attorney for the Western District of New York is the chief federal law enforcement officer in seventeen New York counties: Allegany, Cattaraugus, Chautauqua, Chemung, Erie, Genesee, Livingston, Monroe, Niagara, Ontario, Orleans, Schuyler, Seneca, Steuben, Wayne, Wyoming, and Yates. 

The U.S. District Court for the Western District of New York has jurisdiction over all cases prosecuted by the U.S. Attorney.  the U.S. Attorney is Trini E. Ross, who was assumed office on October 11, 2021.

History
The Western District of New York was formed by taking away seventeen counties from the Northern District of New York, in 1900, that currently represent Western New York. The Office is responsible for overseeing the prosecution of any federal criminal case brought within the 17 counties of Western New York. The Office also represents the United States in all civil matters brought within this territory.

List of U.S. Attorneys for the Western District of New York

Charles H. Brown: 1900–1906 (U.S. Atty. of Northern District since 1899, remained in the Western District) 
Lyman M. Bass: 1906–1909
John Lord O'Brian: 1909–1914
Stephen T. Lockwood: 1915–1922
William J. Donovan: 1922–1924
Thomas Penney, Jr.: 1924–1925
Richard H. Templeton: 1925–1934
George L. Grobe: 1934–1953
John O. Henderson: 1953–1959
Neil A. Farmelo: 1959–1961
John T. Curtin: 1961–1967
Thomas A. Kennelly: 1968
Andrew F. Phelan: 1968–1969
Edgar C. NeMoyer: 1969
Kenneth H. Schroeder Jr.: 1969–1972
John T. Elfvin: 1972–1975
Richard Arcara: 1975–1981
Roger P. Williams: 1981–1982
Salvatore R. Martoche: 1982–1986
Roger P. Williams: 1986–1988
Dennis Vacco: 1988–1993
Patrick H. NeMoyer: 1993–1997
Denise O'Donnell: 1997–2001
Michael A. Battle: 2002–2005
Terrance P. Flynn: 2006–2009
William J. Hochul Jr.: 2010–2016
James P. Kennedy Jr. 2017–2021
Trini E. Ross: 2021–present

References

External links
United States Attorney for the Western District of New York Official Website

Prosecution